Mark Rowe (born 12 July 1947 in Camberwell) is an English amateur light middleweight and professional light middle/middle/light heavyweight boxer of the 1960s and '70s.

Boxing career
As an amateur he was runner-up for the 1966 Amateur Boxing Association of England Light middleweight (71 kg) title, against Thomas "Tom" Imrie (Bucchleuch BC), boxing out of Fitzroy Lodge ABC.

He represented England and won a gold medal at light middleweight beating Thomas "Tom" Imrie (Scotland) in the boxing at the 1966 British Empire and Commonwealth Games in Kingston, Jamaica, Jamaica.

References

External links

Image - Mark Rowe

1947 births
Boxers at the 1966 British Empire and Commonwealth Games
Commonwealth Games gold medallists for England
English male boxers
Light-heavyweight boxers
Light-middleweight boxers
Living people
Middleweight boxers
People from Camberwell
Boxers from Greater London
Commonwealth Games medallists in boxing
Medallists at the 1966 British Empire and Commonwealth Games